CW Octantis, also known as HD 148542, is a solitary, white hued variable star located in the southern circumpolar constellation Octans. It has an apparent magnitude of 6.03, allowing it to be faintly visible to the naked eye. Parallax measurements from Gaia DR3 place the object at a distance of 629 light years.

CW Octantis has a stellar classification of A3 IV, indicating that it is an evolved A-type star heading towards the red giant branch. Zorec and Royer (2012) model it as a dwarf star that has just reached the end of its main sequence lifetime. It has 2.98 times the mass of the Sun and 4.6 times its radius. CW Octantis is estimated to be 188 million years old.

This object is classified as a Alpha2 Canum Venaticorum variable. Most stars of this class have chemical peculiarities in their spectra, but CW Octantis seems to be ordinary. Renson and Manfroid (2009) consider its peculiarity status to be doubtful. Nevertheless, CW Octantis fluctuates between 6.05 and 6.07 in the Hipparcos passband within 2.63 days.

References

Alpha2 Canum Venaticorum variables
Ap stars
A-type subgiants
Octans
Octantis, CW
Octantis, 26
CD-86 00100
148542
83255
6139